Buzurg may refer to:

Bozorgmehr, legendary Sassanian prime-minister of Persia
Bisanda Buzurg, a town and a nagar panchayat in Banda district in the state of Uttar Pradesh, India
Hasan Buzurg, the first of several de facto independent Jalayirid rulers of Iraq and central Iran
Kavir Buzurg, (meaning great salt marsh), lies in the centre of the Dasht-e Kavir, which is a desert located in the middle of the Iranian plateau
Mahtinya Buzurg, a village in Domariaganj, Uttar Pradesh, India
Shahri Buzurg District, one of the 29 districts of Badakhshan Province in eastern Afghanistan